Hola Airlines (Baleares Link Express SL) was an airline based in Palma de Mallorca, Majorca, Spain. It operated European charter services. Its main base was Son Sant Joan Airport, Palma de Mallorca, with another hub at Madrid Barajas International Airport.

History
The airline was established in 2002 and started operations on 15 May 2002. It was set up by Mario Hidalgo, who previously ran Air Europa Express, and was majority owned by Gadair European Airlines with a 51% shareholding. It had 35 employees in February 2009. It ceased operations on 15 February 2010.

Fleet
The Hola Airlines fleet never numbered more than three aircraft. The airline operated the following aircraft types during its existence:

See also
List of defunct airlines of Spain

References

External links

Defunct airlines of Spain
Airlines established in 2002
Airlines disestablished in 2010
Spanish companies established in 2002
Spanish companies disestablished in 2010